Don't Call Me Buckwheat is an album by Garland Jeffreys. It was released in 1992 by RCA Records, his first album in nine years. The title of the album is a reference to a derogatory remark directed toward Jeffreys at a Mets game.

The lead single "Hail Hail Rock n Roll" reached number 12 on the German Singles chart and spent 24 weeks in total on the chart.

Dutch director Anton Corbijn was responsible for the album's cover photography. He directed the video for "Hail Hail Rock n Roll", which was played on heavy rotation on MTV Europe.

Production
The album was produced by Jeffreys. Bernard Purdie, Vernon Reid, and Sly and Robbie appear on the album.

Critical reception
The New York Times wrote that "most of the cuts on the record are impassioned autobiographical reflections on racial and ethnic identity and the struggle for self-esteem by a veteran New York songwriter who is of mixed ancestry: black, white and Puerto Rican." The Chicago Tribune deemed Don't Call Me Buckwheat "an angry album, but it also is a very vulnerable and moving one as well ... There are no simple solutions or empty slogans here." Rolling Stone wrote that it "suffers from having perhaps received a little too much help from Jeffreys's friends ... One hopes that at some point Jeffreys will hook up with a band that's capable of a little spontaneous combustion, as opposed to the airtight perfection of studio pros." Stereo Review called it "a career high-water mark ... how many other fortysomething rockers can make such a claim?" 

No Depression called the album "one of the signature discs" of the 1990s.

Track listing
All tracks composed by Garland Jeffreys
 "Moonshine in the Cornfield" - 1:03
 "Welcome to the World" - 4:07
 "Don't Call Me Buckwheat" - 4:19
 "Color Line" - 4:14
 "Hail Hail Rock 'n' Roll" - 3:52
 "I Was Afraid of Malcolm" - 4:26
 "Bottle of Love" 3:55
 "The Answer" - 4:42
 "Racial Repertoire" - 4:55
 "Spanish Blood" - 4:26
 "Lonelyville" - 4:43
 "Murder Jubilee" - 3:57
 "I'm Not a Know It All" - 2:54

Personnel
Garland Jeffreys - vocals, arrangements, production
Robby Ameen - percussion on "Spanish Blood"
Jeff Bova - keyboards, synthesizer, sequencing
Michael Brecker - saxophone, keyboards
Heidi Iden Carney - strings
Porter Carroll - vocals
Jill Dell'Abate - vocals, production co-ordination
Sly Dunbar - drums, percussion on "Color Line" and "Murder Jubilee"
Bob Franceschini - saxophone on "Spanish Blood"
Alan "Taff" Freedman - guitars, bass guitar
Diva Gray - vocals
Paul Griffin - piano, organ, assistant arranger
Gordon Grody - vocals
Jean Ingraham - strings
Steve Jordan - drums, percussion
Karen Karsrud - strings
Kathryn Kienke - strings
Jay Leonhart - bass guitar
Jesse Levy - strings
J.T. Lewis - drums on "Lonelyville"
Steve Love - guitars on "Lonelyville"
Hugh McCracken - guitars
Ozzie Melendez - trombone, trumpet
Joe Mennonna - accordion, bass guitar, drum programming, saxophones, keyboards, trombone, vocals, arrangements 
Sidney Mills - keyboards
Eugene J. Moye - strings
Janice Pendarvis - vocals
Carol Pool - strings
Bernard Purdie - drums
Jamie Ramos - trombone
Vernon Reid - guitars on "Hail Hail Rock 'n' Roll" and "I Was Afraid of Malcolm"
Deborah Resto - vocals
Elliot Rosoff - strings
Robbie Shakespeare - bass guitar
Claudette Sierra - vocals
Earl "Chinna" Smith - guitars
G.E. Smith - guitars
Vaneese Thomas - vocals
Handel Tucker - keyboards
Raymond Vega - saxophone, trumpet on "Spanish Blood"

References

1991 albums
Bertelsmann Music Group albums
Garland Jeffreys albums